Fábio Henrique Tavares (born 23 October 1993), known as Fabinho, is a Brazilian professional footballer who plays as a midfielder for  club Liverpool and the Brazil national team. A versatile player who mainly plays as a defensive midfielder, Fabinho can also be deployed as a right-back or centre-back. Fabinho is often viewed as one of the best defensive midfielders in the world.

After starting off at Fluminense, he transferred to Rio Ave in 2012. He spent his entire time there out on loan, first at Real Madrid Castilla, and made one substitute appearance for the first team. He spent five years at Monaco, playing 233 total games and scoring 31 goals, and they won Ligue 1 in 2016–17. In his debut season at Liverpool they won the 2018–19 UEFA Champions League. A victory in the 2019 UEFA Super Cup preceded Fabinho playing a significant role in Liverpool winning the 2019–20 Premier League.

Fabinho made his international debut for Brazil in 2015, and was part of their squads at the Copa América in 2015, 2016 and 2021, as well as the 2022 FIFA World Cup.

Club career

Fluminense and Rio Ave
Born in Campinas, São Paulo, Fabinho began his career at Fluminense. He was called into a first team matchday squad for the only time on 20 May 2012, as he was an unused substitute in a 1–0 win over Corinthians for the season's Série A.

On 8 June 2012, Fabinho joined Portuguese Primeira Liga club Rio Ave on a six-year contract.

2012–2013: Loan to Real Madrid
After one month at Rio Ave, Fabinho joined Real Madrid Castilla on a season-long loan on 19 July 2013. He made his professional debut on 17 August, as the Spanish Segunda División season began, playing 90 minutes in the 2–1 defeat at Villarreal. On 28 April 2013, he scored his first goal, heading an added-time equaliser for a 3–3 draw at CD Numancia.

He made his debut for Real Madrid on 8 May 2013, playing 14 minutes in place of Fábio Coentrão and assisting the sixth goal by Ángel Di María in the 6–2 La Liga victory over Málaga at the Santiago Bernabéu Stadium.

Monaco

2013–2015: Loan

On 19 July 2013, Fabinho joined Monaco on a season-long loan deal. He made his debut on 10 August at the Stade Chaban-Delmas in Monaco's opening Ligue 1 match of the 2013–14 season, playing the entire match against Bordeaux, with Monaco winning 2–0. He scored his first goal for Monaco in the 58th minute in their 6–0 home win over Lens in the quarter-finals of the 2013–14 Coupe de France on 26 March 2014.

After completing his one-year loan at Monaco, he rejoined the club on loan for another year on 2 July 2014. On 9 December 2014, he scored the last goal in the Group C Matchday 6 2–0 home win over Zenit St Petersburg (his first UEFA Champions League or UEFA Europa League goal), to enable Monaco to qualify for 2014–15 UEFA Champions League knockout phase as group winners.

2015–2018: Consistent success and distinguished performances
On 19 May 2015, after two seasons on loan at Monaco, Monaco and Rio Ave agreed on the permanent transfer of Fabinho; he signed a contract with Monaco for the next four seasons and would be tied to the club until 30 June 2019. On 20 March 2016, Fabinho won a penalty when fouled by compatriot David Luiz, and converted it for a 2–0 win that was Paris Saint-Germain's first home defeat since May 2014.

On 21 February 2017, Fabinho provided one assist each to Radamel Falcao and Kylian Mbappé in a 5–3 away defeat against Manchester City in the 2016–17 UEFA Champions League round of 16 first-leg match. On 15 March, Fabinho made the score 2–0 for Monaco in the 29th minute by driving home Benjamin Mendy's low cross to help Monaco beat Manchester City 3–1 (aggregate score 6–6) in the second-leg match at the Stade Louis II and advance to the quarter-finals on the away goals rule.

Liverpool

2018–19: Prolific performances and UEFA Champions League victory
On 28 May 2018, Premier League club Liverpool announced that Fabinho would sign for the club on a long-term contract for a reported initial fee of £39 million, effective 1 July. His debut for the club came as an injury-time substitute for Sadio Mané in a Champions League group match against Paris Saint-Germain on 18 September, a 3–2 win at Anfield. He made his league debut in a 1–0 win at Huddersfield Town on 20 October, coming on for the last 21 minutes in place of Adam Lallana. A week later he was granted a first league start in a 4–1 home victory against Cardiff City in central midfield alongside Georginio Wijnaldum, and received praise from Sky Sports. On 26 December, Fabinho scored his first goal for Liverpool in a 4–0 win against Newcastle United.

In early January 2019, Fabinho played at centre-back against Wolverhampton Wanderers in the FA Cup third round and away against Brighton & Hove Albion. Following his performances, manager Jurgen Klopp praised him and stated that he is a "new centre-back option".

On 4 May 2019, with Liverpool's title race going down to the wire, Fabinho won his team a free-kick from which Liverpool scored to beat Newcastle 3–2 away from home. On 1 June, Fabinho started in the 2019 UEFA Champions League final against Tottenham Hotspur, playing the full 90 minutes as the club secured their sixth win in the competition and Fabinho earning his first trophy with the club.

2019–20: Continued success and UEFA Super Cup and Premier League victories

On 14 August 2019, Fabinho played the full 90 minutes in the 2019 UEFA Super Cup against Chelsea, scoring Liverpool's second penalty in the shootout after regular time ended 2–2, in an eventual 5–4 win on penalties. On 27 October, he earned praise from the fans for his performance in a 2–1 win against Tottenham. Fabinho's first goal of the season came against Manchester City on 10 November, scoring an early goal in an eventual 3–1 win and was voted as BBC Sport's man of the match.

On 27 November 2019, during a crucial Champions League match against Napoli, he suffered an early injury after falling awkwardly during a challenge and was substituted after 18 minutes. Two days later, the club announced that the injury would keep Fabinho out of action until the start of 2020.

Fabinho played a major part in Liverpool's Premier League title win that season.

2020–present: Necessary versatility and maintained success
During the 2020–21 season, Fabinho had to play as a centre-back due to the club's injury problems, one of which being the absence of key defender Virgil van Dijk for a time. In December 2020, he made his 100th appearance for Liverpool.

On 3 August 2021, Fabinho signed a long-term contract with Liverpool until 2026. On 12 September 2021, he scored his first goal of the season, tapping home from close range against Leeds United, the second in an eventual 3–0 win. On 9 January 2022, Fabinho scored his first goals in the FA Cup, scoring the second and fourth in a 4–1 third round victory over Shrewsbury Town. Liverpool went on to win the competition on 15 May by beating Chelsea in the final, which ended in a 0–0 draw after extra time and Liverpool winning 5–6 in the penalty shoot-out, although Fabinho was not in the matchday squad for the final. In addition, Fabinho also won the EFL Cup in the 2021–22 season, scoring a Panenka-style penalty in the shoot-out over Chelsea in the final.

International career
Included in coach Dunga's 23-man squad for the 2015 Copa América in Chile, Fabinho made his debut in a warm-up match against Mexico on 7 June of that year, as a half-time substitute for Danilo in a 2–0 victory at Allianz Parque in São Paulo. With Dani Alves playing the entire tournament at right-back, Fabinho did not play at the Copa América, in which Brazil reached the quarter-finals. Fabinho was selected for Brazil's Copa América Centenario squad, although he did not play in any of Brazil's three matches at the tournament.

In June 2021, he was included in Brazil's squad for the 2021 Copa América on home soil.

On 7 November 2022, Fabinho was named in the squad for the 2022 FIFA World Cup.

Style of play
Fabinho is often regarded as one of the best defensive midfielders in the world, with Sky Sports pundit and former Manchester United player Gary Neville saying, "Fabinho... is the best." He is a robust, agile player who is valued for his ability to win back the ball in the midfield and recycle possession quickly. His role as defensive midfielder sometimes requires him to drop further back to play as a third centre-back to cover for Liverpool's fullbacks Andrew Robertson and Trent Alexander-Arnold. His reading of the game is considered outstanding and has led to him being nicknamed 'The Lighthouse' by Liverpool assistant coach Pepijn Lijnders and his teammates. Fabinho has been called "the spine of the team [Liverpool]" by team-mate Virgil van Dijk. Fabinho cites Lionel Messi as the toughest opponent he has ever faced.

Personal life
Fabinho married Rebeca Tavares in 2015, having been together since 2013. The couple revealed Rebeca was pregnant with their first child in July 2022. At Liverpool, he earned himself the nickname, "The Hoover," because according to teammate Joe Gomez, "he cleans up everything." He decided to keep "Fabinho" on his shirt instead of his given names because his mother recommended he do so.

Career statistics

Club

International

Honours
Monaco
Ligue 1: 2016–17

Liverpool
Premier League: 2019–20
EFL Cup: 2021–22
FA Community Shield: 2022
UEFA Champions League: 2018–19; runner-up: 2021–22
UEFA Super Cup: 2019

Brazil
Copa América runner-up: 2021

Individual
UEFA Champions League Team of the Season: 2021–22

References

External links

Profile at the Liverpool F.C. website

1993 births
Living people
Sportspeople from Campinas
Brazilian footballers
Association football defenders
Association football midfielders
Fluminense FC players
Rio Ave F.C. players
Real Madrid Castilla footballers
Real Madrid CF players
AS Monaco FC players
Liverpool F.C. players
Segunda División players
La Liga players
Ligue 1 players
Premier League players
UEFA Champions League winning players
Brazil international footballers
2015 Copa América players
Copa América Centenario players
2021 Copa América players
2022 FIFA World Cup players
Brazilian expatriate footballers
Expatriate footballers in England
Expatriate footballers in Monaco
Expatriate footballers in Portugal
Expatriate footballers in Spain
Brazilian expatriate sportspeople in England
Brazilian expatriate sportspeople in Monaco
Brazilian expatriate sportspeople in Portugal
Brazilian expatriate sportspeople in Spain